The Inter-European Division (EUD) of Seventh-day Adventists is a sub-entity of the General Conference of Seventh-day Adventists, which oversees the Church's work in a portions of Europe, which include the nations of Andorra, Austria, Belgium, the Czech Republic, France, Germany, Gibraltar, Italy, Liechtenstein, Luxembourg, Malta, Monaco, Portugal, Romania, San Marino, Slovakia, Spain and Switzerland. Its headquarters is in Bern, Switzerland.

Until 2012 this Division was the Euro-Africa Division, which included areas in the Middle East and North Africa that were detached from the Division for administrative reasons and placed directly under the General Conference. Founded in 1928, the division membership as of June 30, 2021 is 178,378.

Sub Fields
The Inter-European Division is divided into six Unions Conferences and five Union of Churches. These are divided into local Conferences.

 Austrian Union of Churches Conference 
 Bulgarian Union of Churches Conference 
 Czecho-Slovak Union Conference 
 Bohemian Conference 
 Moravia-Silesian Conference 
 Slovakian Conference 
 Franco-Belgian Union Conference 
 Belgian-Luxembourg Conference 
 North France Conference 
 South France Conference 
 Italian Union of Churches
 North German Union Conference 
 Berlin-Central German Conference 
 Hanse Conference (merger of the former Conferences of Lower Saxony and Hansa) 
 Northern Rhenish-Westfalian Conference 
 Portuguese Union of Churches Conference 
 Romanian Union Conference
 Banat Conference 
 Moldavia Conference 
 Muntenia Conference 
 North Transylvania Conference
 Oltenia Conference 
 South Transylvania Conference
 South German Union Conference 
 Baden-Württemberg Conference 
Bavarian Conference 
 Central Rhenish Conference 
 Spanish Union of Churches Conference 
 Swiss Union Conference 
 French-Italian Swiss Conference 
 German Swiss Conference

History

References

External links

See also
Seventh-day Adventist Church
List of Seventh-day Adventist hospitals
List of Seventh-day Adventist secondary schools
List of Seventh-day Adventist colleges and universities

Adventist organizations established in the 20th century
Seventh-day Adventist Church in Europe